Liatris, commonly known as gayfeather and blazing star. is a genus of flowering plants in the tribe Eupatorieae within the family Asteraceae native to North America (Canada, United States, Mexico and the Bahamas).  Some species are used as ornamental plants, sometimes in flower bouquets. They are perennials, surviving the winter in the form of corms.

Liatris species are used as food plants by the larvae of some Lepidoptera species including the flower moths Schinia gloriosa and Schinia sanguinea, both of which feed exclusively on the genus, and Schinia tertia and Schinia trifascia.

Classification 
Liatris is in the tribe Eupatorieae of the aster family.  Like other members of this tribe, the flower heads have disc florets and no ray florets. Liatris is in the subtribe Liatrinae along with Trilisa, Carphephorus, and other genera. Liatris is closely related to  Garberia, a genus with only one species endemic to Florida. The two genera can be distinguished by the shrub form of the latter and by karyotype.

Species
Species in the genus include:

 Liatris acidota – sharp blazing star, Gulf Coast blazing star - TX LA 
 Liatris aestivalis – summer blazing star - TX OK 
 Liatris aspera – tall blazing star - ONT, United States (Mississippi Valley, Great Lakes, scattered locales in East)
 Liatris borealis - Allegheny Mountains of  PA 
 Liatris × boykinii - GA AL 
 Liatris bracteata – bracted blazing star - TX 
 Liatris chapmanii – Chapman's blazing star - FL GA AL 
 Liatris cokeri – Coker's blazing star - NC SC 
 Liatris compacta – scaly blazing star - AR OK 
 Liatris creditonensis - ONT
 Liatris cylindracea – Ontario blazing star, fewhead blazing star - ONT, central + southeastern United States
 Liatris cymosa – branched blazing star - TX 
 Liatris × deamii 
 Liatris densispicata - MN
 Liatris elegans – pinkscale blazing star, elegant blazing star - TX OK AR LA MS AL FL GA SC
 Liatris elegantula – shaggy blazing star - TN MS AL GA FL 
 Liatris fallacior - ND
 Liatris × frostii  - MN MO
 Liatris garberi – Garber's blazing star - FL Bahamas
 Liatris gholsonii – Gholson's blazing star - FL
 Liatris × gladewitzii - ONT, MI WI IL
 Liatris glandulosa – glandular blazing star - TX 
 Liatris gracilis – slender blazing star - MS AL GA FL SC 
 Liatris helleri – Heller's blazing star, turgid blazing star - MD WV VA NC 
 Liatris hirsuta – hairy blazing star - central + southeastern United States
 Liatris laevigata – shortleaf blazingstar - FL GA 
 Liatris lancifolia – lanceleaf blazingstar - NM TX CO WY KS NE SD IA
 Liatris ligulistylis – Rocky Mountain blazing star, strap-style blazing star - MAN SAS ALB ND SD MN WI IL IA MO NE WY MT CO NM 
 Liatris microcephala – small-head blazing star - NC SC GA AL TN KY 
 Liatris novae-angliae – New England blazing-star
 Liatris ohlingerae – Florida blazing star, scrub blazing star - FL 
 Liatris oligocephala – Cahaba torch - AL 
 Liatris patens – spreading blazing star, Georgia blazing star - FL GA SC 
 Liatris pauciflora – fewflower blazing star - AL GA FL SC NC 
 Liatris pilosa – grass-leaf blazing star, shaggy blazing star - SC NC VA MD DE PA NJ
 Liatris × platylepis - LA 
 Liatris provincialis – Godfrey's blazing star - FL 
 Liatris punctata – dotted blazing star, plains gayfeather - MAN SAS ALB eastern + central United States Coahuila, Nuevo León, Tamaulipas, San Luis Potosí
 Liatris pycnostachya – prairie blazing star, button snakeroot, cattail gayfeather, thickspike gayfeather, Kansas gayfeather - QUE eastern United States
 Liatris × ridgwayi - IL KS
 Liatris savannensis – savanna blazing star - FL 
 Liatris scariosa – northern gayfeather, devil's bite - eastern + central United States
 Liatris × serotina - LA 
 Liatris × spheroidea - ONT
 Liatris spicata – dense blazing star, button snakewort, florist gayfeather, marsh blazingstar, prairie-pine - ONT QUE eastern United States
 Liatris squarrosa – loosescale gayfeather, colicroot, scaly blazing star - central + southeastern United States
 Liatris squarrulosa – southern gayfeather, Appalachian blazing star - south-central + southeastern United States
 Liatris × steelei - IL IN KY
 Liatris tenuifolia – pine-needle gayfeather, shortleaf gayfeather - MS AL GA TN SC 
 Liatris tenuis – gulf blazing star, Shinners' gayfeather - TX LA 
 Liatris virgata – wand blazing star, King's Mountain gayfeather, piedmont gayfeather - VA WV NC SC GA 
 Liatris × weaveri - NE

References

 
Asteraceae genera
Flora of North America
Cormous plants